Camilla Nichol  is a geologist and museum curator. Since 2014 she is the Chief Executive of the United Kingdom Antarctic Heritage Trust.

Career
Nichol studied Geology at the University of Edinburgh and a post-graduate course in Museum Studies at the University of Leicester. Nichol has worked for several museums. She was the Curator of Geology at the Yorkshire Museum, the Head of Collections at Leeds Museums & Galleries, and has also worked for the Hunterian Museum and the Scottish Football Museum.

She is a Trustee of the Cromwell Museum and the Burton Constable Foundation.

Following the years of 2015-2016, Nichol’s publication of "Using Heritage to Engage Antarctic Tourists with Climate Change" allowed for the conclusion that tourism is an effective way to increase awareness of the effects of climate change in the Antarctic region; thereby initiating a greater spread of knowledge about the negative effects taking place in the ice regions of our world.

In 2018, along with a team of researchers, Camilla became invested in a long-term study of penguins in the Antarctic region. Focusing mainly on the Gentoo Penguin (Pygoscelis papua), they were able to scrutinize the population trends of that particular species at a major tourist site in the Antarctic - Goudier Island.

Select publications
Nichol, C., 2017. "Using Heritage to Engage Antarctic Tourists with Climate Change", in Handbook of Climate Change Communication (Vol 2), 305-315.
Dunn, M. J., Forcada, J., Jackson, J. A., Waluda, C. M., Nichol, C., and Trathan, N. 2019. "A long-term study of gentoo penguin (Pygoscelis papua) population trends at a major Antarctic tourist site, Goudier Island, Port Lockroy", Biodiversity and Conservation 28(1), 37-53.

References

Women geologists
British curators
Yorkshire Museum people
Year of birth missing (living people)
Living people
Fellows of the Royal Geographical Society
British chief executives
Trustees of museums
21st-century British geologists
21st-century British women scientists
British women curators
Alumni of the University of Edinburgh
Alumni of the University of Leicester